The Soviet Championship was a rugby union club competition between the domestic teams of the Soviet Union era. It was first contested in 1936, and was last held in 1990.

Results

Results by republic

See also
 Soviet Cup
 Professional Rugby League

External links
 Soviet Era of rugby union

Rugby union in the Soviet Union
Defunct rugby union leagues in Europe
rugby union
1936 establishments in the Soviet Union
Sports leagues established in 1936
Rugby union